Constituent Assembly elections were held in Norway in 1814. The elections were held in Christiania and the surrounding area in February, and in the rest of the country as news of the need for elections arrived. However, in the two Northernmost Amts Nordlandene and Finnmarken in the far north of the country, the elections were not held until July and August, by which time the Assembly had finished its work. As political parties were not officially established until 1884, the 112 elected members were independents.

The Constituent Assembly convened in Eidsvoll to draw up the Constitution of Norway. The delegates were popularly dubbed the "Eidsvoll men" (Eidsvollsmennene). The new constitution was agreed on 16 May 1814, and signed and dated the following day. Elections to a second Constituent Assembly were held on 14 August.

List of members meeting at Eidsvoll on 17 May 1814

Akershus county
 Court chamberlain Peder Anker
 Judge Christian Magnus Falsen
 FarmerKristian Kristensen Kollerud

Aggershuske Ridende Jæg. Corps, Akershusiske skarpskytter Regiment
 Major V.C.Sibbern
 Lieutenant Colonel F.W.Stabell
 First Sergeant Z.Mellebye

Arendal Deputation
 District physician Alexander Christian Møller

Artillerie-Corpset
 Captain Motzfeldt
 Sergeant H.Haslum

Bergen City Deputation
 Judge W.F.K.Christie
 Wholesaler Fredrik Meltzer
 Wholesaler Jens Rolfsen
 Resident chaplain Jonas Rein

Søndre Bergenhuus County
 Judge Arnoldus von Westen Sylow Koren
 Parish pastor Georg Burchard Jersin
 Farmer Brynjel Andersen Gjerager

Nordre Bergenhuus County
 Chancery councilmember and judge Lars Johannes Irgens
 Parish pastor Nicolai Nielsen
 Farmer Peder Hjermann

Bergenhus Regiment
 Captain Ole Elias Holck
 Musketeer Niels Johannesen Loftesnæs

Buskeruds Amt
 Dean F.Schmidt
 Bailiff Johan Collett
 Farmer Christopher Hoen

Bratsberg Amt
 Chancellor, District Governor Severin Løvenskiold
 Justice Councilor Peder Jørgen Cloumann
 Farmer Talleiv Olavsson Huvestad

Christiania
 Professor Georg Sverdrup
 Customs Attorney Omsen

Christiansand
 Assistant Pastor Nicolai Wergeland
 Wholesaler Ole Clausen Mørch

Christians Amt
 Judge Lauritz Weidemann
 Parish Pastor Hans Jacob Stabel
 Farmer Anders Lysgaard

Christiansund
 Merchant John Moses

Dramen
 Manager Nicolai Schejtli

Friderichshald
 Chancery councilmember, justice of the peace, and judge Carl Adolph Dahl

Friedrichsstad
 Chancery councilmember and justice of the peace Andreas Michael Heiberg

Hedemarkens Amt
 District Governor Bendeke
 Judge Andreas Aagaard Kiønig
 Sheriff Ole Olsen Evenstad

Holmestrand
 Parish pastor H.H.Nysom

Jarlsberg Grevskab
 Count Johan Caspar Herman Wedel-Jarlsberg
 Judge Gustav Peter Blom
 Farmer Ole Rasmussen Apeness

Ingenieur Brigaden
 Captain A.Sibbern

Kongsberg
 Mining Master and Supervisor of the Kongsberg Jernverk Poul Steenstrup

Kragerø
 Justice of the Peace, C.Hersleb Horneman

Laurvig
 Justice Councilor and Judge Christian Adolph Diriks

Laurvigs Grevskab
 Landowner Iver Hesselberg
 Ship's captain Anders Hansen Grønneberg
 Farmer Ole Olsen Amundrød

Lister Amt
 Merchant Gabriel Lund junior
 Sheriff Erichstrup
 Farmer T.J.Lundegaard

Mandals
 Farmer Osmund Lømsland
 Farmer Erich Jaabech
 Farmer Sywert Eeg

Molde
 Justice of the Peace F.Motzfeldt

Moss
 Justice of the Peace G.Wulfsberg

Nedenæs Amt
 Owner of an iron works Jacob Aall, junior
 Parish Pastor Hans Jacob Grøgaard
 Sheriff Thor R.Lilleholth

Nordenfjelske Infanteri Regiment
 Captain Peter Blankenborg Prydz
 Musketeer Helge Ellingsen Waagaard

Norske Jeger Corps
 Captain Palle Rømer Fleischer
 Corporal Niels Fredriksen Dyhren

Oplandske Infanterie Regiment
 Colonel D.Hegermann
 First Sergeant Sergeant Haraldstad

Porsgrund
 Wholesaler Jørgen Aall

Raabøigelaugets Amt
 Judge Thomas Bryn
 Farmer Even Torkildsen Lande
 Sheriff Ole Knudsen Tvedten

Romsdals Amt
 County Governor Hilmar Meincke Krohg
 Dean Jens Stub
 Farmer Elling Olsson Walbøe

Røraas Bergkorps
 Captain Richard Floer

Smaalehnenes Amt
 Major V. Sibbern (who also represented the Norwegian Mounted Jegerkorps).
 Dean Peter Ulrik Magnus Hount
 Farmer John Hansen Sørbrøden

Schien Skien
 Wholesaler Didrich (von) Cappelen

Stavanger Bye Stavanger
 Merchant Peder Valentin Rosenkilde

Stavanger Amt Rogaland
 Parish Pastor Lars Andreas Oftedahl
 Merchant Christen Mølbach
 Farmer Asgaut Olsen Regelstad

Søe-Deffensionen
 Commodore J.S.Fabricius
 Lieutenant T.Konow
 Midshipman P.Johnsen
 Able Bodied Seaman Even Thorsen

Søndenfieldske Infanterie-Regiment
 Colonel D.Petersen
 Musketeer Ole Svendsen

Søndenfieldske Dragon-Regiment
 Captain Eilert Waldemar Preben Ramm
 Corporal Peder Paulsen Balke

Tellemarkske Infanterie Regiment
 Captain Enevold Steenblock Høyum
 First Sergeant Gullik Madsen Røed

Trondhjems Bye
 Councilor of State Andreas Rogert
 Wholesaler Peter Schmidt jr.

Søndre Trondhjems Amt
 Parish Pastor Jacob Hersleb Darre
 Judge Anders Rambech
 Sexton Lars Larsen Forsæth

Nordre Trondhiems Amt
 Dean Hans Christian Ulrik Midelfart
 Parish Pastor Hieronymus Heyerdahl
 Farmer Sivert Bratberg

Første Trondhjemske Regiment
 Captain Georg Ulrich Wasmuth
 Sergeant Daniel Larsen Schevig

Andet Trondhjemske Regiment
 Captain Jacob Erik Lange
 Sergeant Helmer Andersen Gjedeboe

Trondhiemske Dragon Corps
 First Lieutenant Frederik Hartvig Johan Heidmann
 Quartermaster Petter Johnsen Ertzgaard

Tønsberg
 Wholesaler Carl Peter Stoltenberg

Westerlenske Inf. Regiment
 Major Just Henrik Ely
 Underjeger Omund Bjørnsen Birkeland

Øster Risør
 Merchant and iron works owner Henrik Carstensen

External links 
Original text of the Norwegian Constitution (Norwegian)

References and notes

Constituent
Norway 1
1814 02
Political history of Norway